The Princes Motorway is a  predominantly dual carriage untolled motorway that links Sydney to Wollongong and further south through the Illawarra region to . Part of the Australian Highway 1 network, the motorway is designated with the route number M1. 

The motorway is sometimes known by its previous signposting F6 (Freeway Route 6) and its previous name, the Southern Freeway, which applied to the sections between Waterfall and Bulli Tops as well as Gwynneville and Yallah. The section between Bulli Tops and  Gwynneville was known as Mount Ousley Road, and was first built as a defence route and later upgraded to dual carriageway standards. In early 2013, as part of the New South Wales alphanumeric route conversion process, the entire motorway was renamed to its current name and signposted M1.

It is the backbone of road traffic in the Illawarra. As Wollongong and Port Kembla are important industrial centres, freight traffic is heavy. Despite the current decline of the local steel industry, emergence of Wollongong as a commuter city of Sydney has kept the motorway busy.

Sections 

In the north, the Princes Motorway route starts at Waterfall, taking more or less a parallel route with Princes Highway until the sprawling Bulli Tops interchange (with Appin Road (B69) and Princes Highway).

The motorway can be divided into four sections:
between Waterfall and Bulli Tops (formerly Southern Freeway)
between Bulli Tops and Gwynneville (also known as Mount Ousley Road)
between Gwynneville to Yallah (formerly Southern Freeway)
Albion Park Rail Bypass

Waterfall to Bulli Tops section 
Construction of the section between Waterfall and Bulli Tops commenced in July 1970. At 22.9km, it was then the longest section of freeway to completed at one time, at a cost of $30.5 million. Financed by State Government bonds, from its opening on 24 July 1975, this section of freeway initially incurred a toll. This part of the freeway did not feature the Helensburgh Interchange (which subsequently opened in February 2000). The toll operated for 20 years, which was 10 years short of its intended operating length. The main reason for this was local residents complaining that the F3 Freeway had its toll dropped in 1988, which was at the time intended to be dropped as its loans had been fully paid off unlike those of the F6.

After much pressure the toll for the F6 freeway was removed on 30 July 1995 as the loans had been repaid. Remnants of the tollbooths could initially be seen at the old toll plaza at Waterfall, such as faint markings and a set of warning lights in the southbound direction for the toll plaza. These remnants have since been removed.

To complement the tollway, the dual carriageways of the Princes Highway from Waterfall north to Loftus and the Sutherland bypass were constructed and opened to traffic on 16 September 1975.

Mount Ousley Road section 
The section between Bulli Tops and Gwynneville was previously named as part of Mount Ousley Road, and is still often referred to as such. Mount Ousley Road was built in 1942 as a defence route, involving the reconstruction of part of a 19th century route from Bulli Tops to the Picton-Mt Keira road (the southern section not incorporated into the defence route is Clive Bissell Drive), and the construction of a new section of road to descend the escarpment and terminate at the Princes Highway at North Wollongong. (The easternmost 3.5 km of Picton Road, from Mount Keira Road to Mount Ousley Road, was also constructed as part of this project.)

From the 1960s to the 1980s Mount Ousley Road was gradually upgraded, initially by the construction of overtaking lanes, then the staged extension of the overtaking lanes to ultimately provide continuous two lanes in each direction, and a third lane northbound from the foot of Mount Ousley to Clive Bissell Drive and a third southbound lane from Clive Bissell Drive to New Mount Pleasant Road. This was followed by deviations to replace sharp curves on steep gradients on the northern approach to Bellambi Creek and both approaches to Cataract Creek. A continuous New Jersey median was subsequently installed in stages. Also during the 1980s extensive truck management measures were installed on the long, steep descent from Clive Bissell Drive into Wollongong, following a number of fatal truck crashes on this section.

The Mount Ousley Road section of the Princes Motorway is sometimes not considered part of the freeway proper, as it is not built to full freeway standards, containing left-in/left-out intersections and the at-grade intersection at the foot of Mount Ousley, where the motorway proper diverges from Mount Ousley Road. This intersection is proposed to be replaced by a grade-separated interchange. The federal government announced funding for the interchange in May 2021.

In November 2015, it was announced that the section between Bulli Tops and Picton Road would have a third lane added in each direction. , detailed design works have been completed.

Gwynneville to Yallah section 
The construction of the first stage of the Princes Motorway  between Gwynneville and Yallah commenced in May 1959. This was the length from the interchange of the Princes Motorway and Memorial Drive in Gwynneville to the Princes Highway at West Wollongong. This forms the majority of what was built as a north-south bypass of Wollongong central business district, and was the first section built of an arterial road planned to run from Thirroul in the north to Dapto in the south. The CBD bypass was opened from the Princes Highway at North Wollongong to Foley Street in December 1959,  from Foley Street to Phillips Avenue in 1961 and from Phillips Avenue to the Princes Highway at West Wollongong in July 1963. Duplication from Gwynneville to West Wollongong was completed in 1965. 

In March 1964 the connector from Mount Ousley Road at the foot of Mount Ousley to the CBD bypass in Gwynneville was opened as a single carriageway, and was duplicated in the early 1970s. The intersection with the CBD bypass at Gwynneville remained an at-grade intersection until the grade-separated interchange entered service in December 1998.

Following completion of the Mount Ousley-Gwynneville connector the freeway continued making its way southward, with the extension from West Wollongong to The Avenue at Figtree opening in 1967, and then from Five Islands Road to Northcliffe Drive in 1973 (albeit as a single carriageway, with duplication finished in 1975). The intermediate section from The Avenue to Five Islands Road, including the interchange with Masters Road, was opened in 1975. Construction then continued south from Northcliffe Drive to Kanahooka Road in 1978 (with duplication concluding in 1979), to Fowlers Road in 1981 (with duplication concluding in 1983), to the Princes Highway near Tallawarra power station in 1986 (with duplication concluding in 1987), and to Yallah (in conjunction with grade separation of the junction with the Princes Highway) in 1989.

Albion Park Rail Bypass
At the southern end, the Princes Motorway was extended to Oak Flats via a 9.8 km bypass of Albion Park Rail.  The bypass completed the 'missing link' in the four-lane road between Sydney and Berry (currently being extended to Bomaderry). 
The bypass was constructed on a corridor which was identified by the Roads and Traffic Authority in a study in the mid 1990s. In 2013, Roads and Maritime Services (successor to the RTA) confirmed the reserved corridor to be suitable for the bypass.

The bypass was completed on 9 October 2021, several months ahead of schedule. The section of the bypass between Yallah and the Illawarra Highway (Terry Street) interchange was opened to traffic in May 2021. The northbound carriageway of the remainder of the bypass (ie north from the New Lake Entrance Road interchange to the Illawarra Highway interchange) opened to traffic on 7 August 2021. The remainder of the southbound carriageway was opened to traffic on 9 October 2021, thereby completing the bypass.

Exits and interchanges

Proposed extensions

Northern extension

The County of Cumberland planning scheme of 1948 outlined an F6 extension from the current-day end-point at Waterfall. As such, an F6 corridor was set aside that passes through the Royal National Park from Waterfall to Campbell Road in St Peters. The land reservation tract currently passes through the suburbs of Loftus, Kirrawee, Gymea, Miranda, Taren Point, Sandringham, Sans Souci, Ramsgate, Monterey, Kogarah, Brighton-Le-Sands, Rockdale, Banksia, Arncliffe, Kyeemagh and Tempe.

Of the proposed extension, only the six-lane Captain Cook Bridge and a short connecting section of Taren Point Road to the south have been built. Establishment of the bridge section of the F6 extension began in 1962, expedited to replace the ferry service that had operated from Taren Point to Sans Souci since 1916. Captain Cook Bridge was opened in May 1965.

In the original plan, the F6 would connect to the Western Distributor. Then, in August 1977, premier Neville Wran cancelled the inner section of the F6 link, which at the time had an estimated construction cost of $96 million. At the same time, Wran announced that the inner section reservation would be sold off and the proposed extension would instead terminate at St Peters, a medium density industrial suburb.

Prior to the 2007 federal election, the Liberal–Nationals (Coalition) government promised to allocate $20 million towards planning for the F6 extension. Although the Coalition lost the 2007 election, the funding was once again promised at the subsequent 2010 federal election. This funding would ensure the project is "shovel ready" when funding becomes available.

In the mid 2010s, the F6 extension project was revived under the Liberal–National coalition state government. This project has since been renamed M6 Motorway.

See also 

 Freeways in New South Wales

References 

Highways in Australia
Wollongong
Former toll roads in Australia
Highway 1 (Australia)